Punctelia transtasmanica is a species of foliose lichen in the family Parmeliaceae. It is found in Australasia.

Taxonomy
The lichen was described as a new species in 2005 by Australian lichenologists John Alan Elix and Gintaras Kantvilas. There it was found on Tasmanian pepperberry growing in wet scrub. The specific epithet refers to "the occurrence of this species along the eastern and western shores of the Tasman Sea". The lichen also occurs in Flinders Island (northeast of Tasmania), where it is locally common, and the North Island of New Zealand. Punctelia transtasmanica resembles P. borreri, and had historically been confused with that species. They can be distinguished by differences in chemical reactions to lichen spot tests.

Description
The thallus comprises crowded lobes, sometimes overlapping, each measuring 1–4 mm. The thallus surface is more or less smooth with wrinkles near the centre, and has soredia and pseudocyphellae. The undersurface of the thallus is wrinkled, brownish black to black in colour, with many simple (unbranched) brown to black rhizines. The results of standard lichen spot tests are cortex K+ (yellow); medulla K−, C+ (red), KC+ (red), P−. Punctelia transtasmanica contains the secondary chemicals atranorin, chloroatranorin (both minor), lecanoric acid (major), and gyrophoric acid (trace amounts).

References

transtasmanica
Lichen species
Lichens described in 2005
Lichens of Australia
Lichens of New Zealand
Taxa named by John Alan Elix
Taxa named by Gintaras Kantvilas